Stephen Codman (c. 1796 – 6 October 1852) was a Canadian composer of English descent. His known compositions all date from before 1835 and his output mainly consists of works for solo voice or vocal ensembles.

Early life and education
Codman was born in Norwich, England. He was a pupil of John Christmas Beckwith and William Crotch.

Career
In 1816 Codman came to Canada to assume the post of organist at Holy Trinity Anglican Cathedral in Quebec City, most likely succeeding John Bentley. He remained in that post up until his death in Quebec City 36 years later.

Two of his songs, The Fairy Song and They Are Not All Sweet Nightingales, were published by Goulding, D'Almaine, and Co in 1827, placing them among the oldest published Canadian compositions in history. He also wrote an instrumental piece for the organ, titled "Invocation".

Codman died in Quebec City on October 6, 1852.

References

1796 births
1852 deaths
19th-century composers
Canadian composers
Canadian male composers
Canadian organists
Male organists
Musicians from Norwich
19th-century British male musicians
19th-century organists